Naour may refer to:
Naour, Jordan
Naour, Morocco